The Faroe Islands competed at the 2000 Summer Paralympics in Sydney, Australia. The islands' delegation consisted in two swimmers, Heidi Andreasen and Esther Hansen.

Andreasen won all four of the Faroe Islands' medals: three silver (S8 50m freestyle, S8 100m freestyle, S8 400m freestyle) and one bronze (S8 100m backstroke).

Medallists

See also 
Faroe Islands at the Paralympics

References

Nations at the 2000 Summer Paralympics
2000
Paralympics